Runcorn is an industrial town in the borough of Halton, Cheshire, England. This list contains the 27 buildings that are recorded in the National Heritage List for England as designated listed buildings in the part of the borough lying to the south of the River Mersey outside the urban area of Runcorn.  The area covered includes the villages of Clifton, Daresbury, Preston Brook, Preston on the Hill, and Moore.  Three of the buildings in the area are classified as Grade II*, and the others are at Grade II; there are no buildings in Grade I. In the United Kingdom, the term listed building refers to a building or other structure officially designated as being of special architectural, historical, or cultural significance. These buildings are in three grades: Grade I consists of buildings of outstanding architectural or historical interest; Grade II* includes particularly significant buildings of more than local interest; Grade II consists of buildings of special architectural or historical interest. Buildings in England are listed by the Secretary of State for Culture, Media and Sport on recommendations provided by English Heritage, which also determines the grading.

Although the urban area of Runcorn grew rapidly during the Industrial Revolution, and again with the growth of the New Town during the 1960s and 1970s, the surrounding area, mainly to the west of the town, has experienced only a small growth in population.  The villages are small and discrete, and are separated by farmland and woodland.  The area covered by the list is crossed by roads, railways, and canals, with which some of the listed buildings are associated.  The oldest of these are the canals: the Bridgewater Canal, the Trent and Mersey Canal, the Weaver Navigation and the Manchester Ship Canal.  The railways consist of the West Coast Main Line – the section between Crewe and Warrington, and the branch to Liverpool – and the Chester-Manchester Line.  The major roads are the M56 motorway and the A6 road, together with sections of the A533, the A557 and the A558 roads.

The ages of the structures on the list range from the ruin of Clifton Hall, built in 1565, to the telephone kiosk in Daresbury, which dates from the 1930s.  The three Grade II* listed buildings include the only church in the list and two former mansion houses.  The church and one of the mansion houses are in Daresbury, and the other mansion house is in Moore.  Daresbury also contains a former sessions house.  Moore reflects its rural past with two farmhouses and a number of cottages.  Also in the village of Moore are a public house, a former school, and a bridge over the Bridgewater Canal.  Preston Brook stands on the junction of the Bridgewater and the Trent and Mersey Canals; other than one listed house, the structures are associated with the canals – a former warehouse, a tunnel entrance, a milepost, and two air shafts.  Other listed buildings are in more isolated sites and include another farmhouse, another canal bridge, a swing bridge over the Manchester Ship Canal, and a railway viaduct over the Weaver Navigation and A557 road.

Key

Listed buildings

See also

 List of listed buildings in Runcorn (urban area)
 Grade I listed buildings in Cheshire
 Grade II* listed buildings in Cheshire

References
Citations

Sources

Runcorn
Buildings and structures in Runcorn
Runcorn